Agnihotram Ramanuja Tatachariar (1907–2008) was a renowned Vedic scholar of Vaishnava sect of Hinduism.  He was a descendant of Nathamuni hailing from Kumbakonam.  He was recipient of two national awards for his contribution to Vedic studies and Sanskrit literature.

Books
Sidhanta Ratnavali (Saraswati Mahal Library-Tanjavore)
Hindu Madham Enge Pogirathu?
Rshyashrunga Samhitai (Saraswati Mahal Library-Tanjavore)
Yaskarin Nirukta (Saraswati Mahal Library Tanjavore)
Vedakalina Janatantra Sthanani (Tirumala Tirupati Devastanam Publications)
Eternal Relevance of Vedas (Tirumala Tirupati Devastanam Publications)
Gayatri Meditation
Azhvargalum Vedangalum
Varalatril Pirantha Vainavam
Hindu Culture (Bhavans)
Women in Vedas (Yogakshema Trust)
Indhu Madham Engay Pogirathu (Nakeeran Publications) 
 Sadungalin Kadhai - Nakeeran Publications (Indhu Madham Engay Pogirathu - Part 2)

References

Vaishnavism
People from Thanjavur district
1907 births
2008 deaths